Adam Willis Wagnalls (September 24, 1843 – September 3, 1924) was an American publisher. He was the co-founder of the Funk & Wagnalls Company in 1877.

Wagnalls was born in Lithopolis, Ohio, but moved away at age 5.  Wagnalls attended Wittenberg College (now Wittenberg University) in Springfield, Ohio, with Isaac Kaufmann Funk, where he became a lutheran minister. He married Hester Anna Willis, also a native of Lithopolis.  They had one child, Mabel Wagnalls Jones.

Isaac Kaufmann Funk had founded the business of I. K. Funk & Company in 1876. In 1877, Adam Wagnalls  joined the firm as a partner. The two changed the name of the firm to Funk & Wagnalls Company in 1890. Prior to 1890, F. & W. published only religious-oriented works. The publication of The Literary Digest in 1890 marked a change for the firm to a publisher of general reference dictionaries and encyclopedias. The firm followed in 1894 with its most memorable publication, The Standard Dictionary of the English Language. 1912 saw the publication of the Funk & Wagnalls Standard Encyclopedia.

On the death of her mother in 1914, Mabel Wagnalls Jones established the Wagnalls Memorial Library as a gift to Lithopolis and Bloom Township. The Wagnalls Memorial Library is constructed of native free stone in the Tudor-Gothic Style. A few years later she established the Wagnalls Foundation.  The Wagnalls Foundation maintains a close relationship with the Library and is entrusted to supervise and protect the Library’s property and assets. The Foundation also oversees and distributes the Wagnalls College Scholarship Program that awards local graduating high school seniors and college students who meet specific requirements with tuition money for their education. This facility provides people living in the area and its visitors with a center for educational, cultural and literary arts activities.

Wagnalls died on September 3, 1924, in Northport, New York and is buried with his wife and their daughter at Lithopolis Cemetery.

References

Sources
Caskets on Parade

External links
 
  Adam Willis Wagnalls at New World Encyclopedia.
 Wagnalls Memorial Library

1843 births
1924 deaths
American publishers (people)
Wittenberg University alumni
People from Lithopolis, Ohio
People from Northport, New York
19th-century American businesspeople